The Pashashibou River is a river in the Côte-Nord region of Quebec, Canada. It flows into the Gulf of Saint Lawrence.

Location

The river is scarcely navigable in a canoe for the first  from its mouth, and then becomes no more than a stream.
The mouth of the Pashashibou River is in the municipality of Aguanish in the Minganie Regional County Municipality. 

The shoreline extending to both sides of the river mouth is protected by the  Pashashibou Bay Waterfowl Concentration Area (Aire de concentration d'oiseaux aquatiques de la Baie Pashashibou), an IUCN Management Category IV region designated in 2005 and managed by the Ministry of Forests, Wildlife and Parks.

Name

The Innu of Natashquan call the river Pihu Hipu, which means "river with a lynx".
Jacques Cartier named the bay Havre sainct Nicollas in 1535.
The present name is derived from the Innu language term pishi-shebau.
This can be interpreted as meaning "sharp rock" or "dry river".

Description

The Dictionnaire des rivières et lacs de la province de Québec (1914) says,

Basin

Part of the river basin is in the unorganized territory of Lac-Jérôme and part in the municipality of Aguanish.
It lies between the basins of the Little Watshishou River to the west and the Nabisipi River to the east.
A map of the ecological regions of Quebec shows the river basin in sub-regions 6j-T and 6m-T of the east spruce/moss subdomain.

Notes

Sources

Rivers of Côte-Nord